Kédang (Kdang, Dang, Kedangese) is a language spoken in the Kedang region on the north coast of Lembata Island, east of Flores, in Indonesia. The language belongs to the Austronesian family and its sub-family, Malayo-Polynesian. More specifically, the language is within the Flores-Lembata sub-group. There are approximately 30,000 speakers of the language.

Background 
The name of the language is also the name of the region where the language is spoken, Kedang. The region ranges to about 266 square kilometres including two administrative areas – Omesuri and Buyaqsuri. As of today, there are approximately about 30,000 speakers of the language. The majority of the speakers is engaged in agricultural productions which are mainly farming and fishing.

Phonology

Vowels 
Kédang has a total of twelve vowels in its language, separated into two sets evenly with six vowels per set. One set is composed of modal vowels or also known as normal vowels while the other set is breathy vowels. The vowels can be distinct by two different methods: by the word initial position and by the pitch. Modal vowels (normal vowels) occur in the middle and the final position while breathy vowels do not. While the breathy vowels are pronounced at a lower pitch.

Consonants 
There are twenty consonants in the Kédang alphabet. The consonants display different manners of articulation including plosives, nasals, lateral, flap, trill, fricatives and continuant.

Word classes 
Kédang developed its word classes to include nouns, pronouns, adjectives, verbs, adverbs, numerals, prepositions, interjections, conjunctions and classifiers.

Nouns 
Nouns are formed when affixes are added to the verbs. Kédang's affixes are the nominalizing prefix N-, the nominalizing infix -an-, the suffix -n and the free form wala.
 The nominalizing prefix N- replaces the initial consonant. For example:
 t →  n       'to advise' →  'advice'
 k → n       'to speak' →  'language'
 The nominalizing infix  is added after the initial consonant. For example:
  'to flow' →  'current'
  'to cover a pot with a lid' →  'lid'
 The suffix  is added to verbs and adjectives at the end of the words. For example:
  'to follow' →  'offspring'
  'dead' →  'corpse'
 The free form  follows after a verb to indicate the person who is acting out the verb. For examples:
  'to sell' →  'seller'
  'to play' →  'player'

Pronouns 
Kédang's pronouns follow the three-way system of singular-dual-plural. They are divided into seven categories: personal, emphatic, possessive, emphatic-possessive, adessive, agent focus and action focus.

Adjectives 
Kédang adjectives are divided into two functions: predicative and attributive. In order to distinguish these two functions, a suffix -n is added after the end vowel of a predicative adjective for it to become attributive. If the adjective ends with a consonant, there will be no change.

Verbs 
There is only one verb tense in Kédang that is fully developed – future tense. The other tenses usually require an adverb that indicates time (past, present or future) to support the content along with the verb used.

Notes

References 
 
 

Flores-Lembata languages
Languages of Indonesia